The 1980–81 Notre Dame Fighting Irish men's basketball team represented the University of Notre Dame during the 1980–81 NCAA Division I men's basketball season. The team was coached by Digger Phelps and was ranked in the Associated Press poll for the entirety of the season. As a 2 seed, the Fighting Irish defeated the 10 seed James Madison in the second round, 54–45. Notre Dame would fall to BYU in the 1981 NCAA Division I Basketball Tournament.

Roster

Schedule and results

|-
!colspan=9 style=| Regular Season

|-
!colspan=9 style=| NCAA Tournament

Rankings

Players selected in NBA drafts

References 

Notre Dame
Notre Dame Fighting Irish
Notre Dame
Notre Dame Fighting Irish
Notre Dame Fighting Irish men's basketball seasons